

Storms
Note:  indicates the name was retired after that usage in the respective basin

Fabian
 1981 – struck Cam Ranh Bay, Vietnam.
 1985 (January) – passed near the Yap Main Islands.
 1985 (September) – threatened no land.
 1988 – did not impact land.
 1991 – struck the Isle of Youth and mainland Cuba.
 1997 – remained over the open ocean.
 2003 – Category 4 hurricane, caused $300 million damage and four deaths after passing directly over Bermuda.
 2013 – brought minor damage in China and Vietnam.
 2017 – struck Hong Kong and Shenzhen.
 2021 – made landfalls in the Putuo District of Zhoushan and Pinghu, China.

Fabio
 1982 – A Category 1 hurricane that stayed away from land.
 1988 – A Category 4 hurricane that passed south of Hawaii but did not affect land.
 1994 – A weak and short lived storm that did not affect land.
 2000 – A weak storm that did not affect land.
 2006 – A short lived storm that did not affect land while tropical, but its remnants affected Hawaii.
 2012 – A Category 2 hurricane that did not affect land while tropical, but its remnants affected Baja California.
 2018 – A Category 2 hurricane that became the earliest sixth named storm in the Eastern Pacific on record, never affected land.

Faith
 1947 –  a strong tropical storm minimal affected Taiwan and Japan.
 1966 – A Category 3 hurricane that holds the record for the longest track of a hurricane ever.
 1972 – a Category 1 tropical cyclone (Australian scale) impact Queensland.
 1998 – struck both the Philippines and Vietnam during December 1998.

Falcon
 2003 – a tropical depression that was only recognized by PAGASA.
 2007 – struck South Korea.
 2011 – approached Korea.
 2015 – powerful and long-lived cyclone, passed between Okinawa and Miyako-jima.
 2019 – a tropical storm that passed along the coasts of the Philippines, Taiwan and China and hit South Korea.

 Fanele (2009) – the first cyclone of tropical cyclone status to strike western Madagascar since Cyclone Fame one year prior.

 Fani (2019) – extremely tropical cyclone to strike the Indian state of Odisha since the 1999 Odisha cyclone. 

 Fakir (2018) – a short-lived yet damaging tropical cyclone that affected Réunion and Mauritius in late April 2018. 

 Fanoos (2005) – was the fifth storm to affect southern India in six weeks.

 Fantala (2016) – the most intense tropical cyclone recorded in the South-West Indian Ocean in terms of sustained winds.

Fausto
 1984 – a Category 2 hurricane that passed near Southern California.
 1990 – a Category 1 hurricane mostly stayed at sea.
 1996 – made landfall on southern Baja California
 2002 – regenerated into a tropical storm well north of the Hawaiian islands
 2008 – ran parallel to the Mexican Rivera
 2014 – never threatened land
 2020 – remnants brought severe storms in California, killing one.

Faxai
 2001 – a Category 5 typhoon mostly stayed at sea.
 2007 – a short-lived tropical storm that had minor effects on land.
 2014 – had no effects on land.
 2019 – A Category 4 typhoon that made landfall in the Kantō region of Japan.

Fay
 1978 – affected Fiji.
 2002 – a tropical storm that caused minor damage in Texas and northern Mexico.
 2004 – a Category 5 storm that made landfall in Western Australia.
 2008 –  a near hurricane strength tropical storm that made landfall in Florida four times, the first known storm in history to do so.
 2014 – a Category 1 hurricane that affected Bermuda.
2020 – a moderate tropical storm that affected New Jersey, earliest sixth named storm in the Atlantic basin.

Faye
 1949 – a category 2 typhoon impact Japan.
 1952 – a weak tropical storm impact Philippines.
 1957 – a powerful category 5 typhoon not make landfall.
 1960 – a Category 4 typhoon passes off the coast of Japan.
 1963 – a Category 3 typhoon struck Hong Kong killing 3 people.
 1965 – did not make landfall.
 1968 – a powerful 5 category typhoon not make landfall.
 1971 – a powerful tropical storm impact Philippines.
 1974 – a powerful tropical storm hit the Philippines and Thailand.
 1975 – a Category 2 hurricane that had minor effects in Bermuda.
 1978 – stayed at sea.
 1982 – a long-lived typhoon that struck the Philippines in August 1982.
 1985 – a strong typhoon made landfall Philippines.
 1989 – a strong tropical storm impact Philippines, South China and Vietnam.
 1992 – a weak tropical storm hit Philippines and China.
 1995 – passed South Korea, a rogue wave hitting Pusan Harbor, the largest port in South Korea, resulting in two ships collided.

 Favio (2007) – the first known tropical cyclone that passed south of Madagascar to strike Africa as an intense tropical cyclone.

 Fefa
 1979 – remained well at sea.
 1985 – moved parallel to the Mexican coastline.
 1991 – eventually impacted Hawaii after being downgraded to a tropical depression.

 Fehi (2018) – took a south-southeast track across the South Pacific, transitioning to an extratropical cyclone as it approached New Zealand.

Felicia
 1997 – a Category 4 hurricane which formed in the open ocean, causing no known damage or casualties.
 2000 – remained over the open ocean.
 2003 – a moderate tropical storm which remained at sea, crossing into the Central Pacific, but then dissipated well east of Hawaii.
 2009 – a Category 4 hurricane which remained at sea, dissipating before hitting Hawaii.
 2015 – remained at sea as a weak tropical storm.
 2021 – an unusually small Category 4 hurricane which formed and dissipated in the open ocean.

Felix
 1980 – did not affect land.
 1989 – Category 1 hurricane that did not threaten land.
 1995 – Category 4 hurricane that passed very near Bermuda.
 2001 – Category 3 hurricane that never threatened land.
 2007 – Category 5 hurricane that made landfall in northern Nicaragua, causing at least 133 deaths and hundreds of millions of dollars in damages in Central America.
 2018 – formed from the remnants of the nor'easter which affected the eastern United States in early March 2018.

Fengshen
 2002 – A Category 5 storm that remained over open waters for most of its life, then brushed southern Japan.
 2008 – A Category 3 storm that wrecked the Philippines, capsizing the MV Princess of the Stars and killing hundreds, then caused flooding in mainland China.
 2014 – a storm which formed during the weak peak of the season.
 2019 – a very strong late season Category 4 typhoon that remained at sea.

Ferdie
 2012 – a strongest tropical cyclone to strike the Chinese province of Guangdong since Hagupit in 2008, and was regarded as the strongest storm to affect Hong Kong and Macau in more than ten years.
 2016  – a powerful tropical cyclones on record impacting the Batanes in the Philippines, Taiwan, as well as Fujian Province in September 2016.
 2020 – a severe tropical storm that affected China in August 2020 causing 1.1 billion yuan (US$159 million) in damage.

Ferdinand
 1984 – a weak tropical cyclone paralleled the north coast of the Northern Territory until it made landfall near Maningrida causing minor damage.
 2020 – without affecting any landmass

Feria
 2001 – a large and deadly system that caused heavy rains and landslides throughout the Philippines, Taiwan, and China.
 2005  – struck Taiwan and China.
 2009 – struck Philippines.

Fernand
 2013 – a short-lived tropical storm that struck Veracruz, Mexico.
 2019 – another short-lived tropical storm that made landfall over northeastern Mexico.

Fernanda
 1960 – Category 1 hurricane paralleled Mexico's coast.
 1968 – never affected land.
 1972 – this tropical cyclone caused no known impact.
 1976 – never affected land.
 1981 – never affected land.
 1987 – never affected land.
 1993 - threatened Hawaii but headed out to sea.
 1999 – never affected land.
 2005 – never affected land.
 2011 – never affected land.
 2017 – a powerful Category 4 hurricane second-most powerful hurricane at 10.9°N in the eastern pacific, after Hurricane Olaf.

 Fezile (2022) – never affected land.

Fico (1978) – a longest-lived hurricane of the 1978 Pacific hurricane season and became the longest-lasting Pacific hurricane on record, a record broken by Hurricane Tina fourteen years later.

Fifi
 1958 – paralleled the Lesser Antilles without making landfall.
 1974 – a devastating system that killed thousands in Honduras and passed into the Pacific, becoming Hurricane Orlene.
 1977 – passed west of Réunion as a result of rainfall, flooding damaged crops and roads, one person died while trying to cross the flooded road.
 1982 – severe tropical cyclone reaches Western Australia.
 1991 – killed 29 in Western Australia.

Filao (1988) – a moderately intense tropical cyclone that caused widespread flooding in Mozambique in 1988.

Fili
 1989 – caused minor damage in Niue
 2003 – did not affect land
 2022 – affected New Caledonia

Fina (2011) – not make landfall.

Fiona
 1971 – a severe tropical cyclone that made landfall in the northern coast of Australia. 
 1974 – operationally considered to be two separate storms, but reduced to one in post-analysis.
 1998 – a weak tropical cyclone that churned off the coast of Madagascar. 
 2003 – brought significant rainfall to the western Australian coast.
 2010 – a moderate but disorganized tropical storm, moved in the central Atlantic without threatening land. 
 2016 – a weak tropical storm that churned across the open ocean.
 2022 – a powerful and long-lived tropical cyclone which caused widespread damage over portions of the Caribbean and Eastern Canada, as well as being the costliest tropical cyclone for Canada on record.

Fitow
 2001 – struck Hainan island and mainland China, killing 4.
 2007 – struck Japan, killing at least 2.
 2013 – a strongest typhoon to make landfall in Mainland China during October since 1949.

Firinga (1989) – produced record-breaking rainfall on the French overseas department of Réunion.

Fletcher (2014) – a weak system that produced torrential rains over parts of Queensland, Australia in February 2014.

Flo
 1948 – a system which was eventually considered to be a typhoon; affected South China.
 1990 – a powerful tropical cyclone that made landfall in Japan, claiming 40 lives.
 1993 – a minimal but erratic typhoon which devastated the Philippines and killed at least 500 people due to flooding.
 
 Flora
 1947 – a powerful category 3 typhoon impact Philippines.
 1955 – A category 2 hurricane, stayed at sea.
 1959 – a category 1 hurricane minimal affected Azores. 
 1962 – a weak tropical storm not make landfall. 
 1963 – is among the deadliest Atlantic hurricanes in recorded history, with a death total of at least 7,193.
 1964 – a category 3 tropical cyclone (australian scale) impact in the Gulf of Carpentaria.
 1975 – a Category 2 tropical cyclone (Australian scale) impact Vanuatu and New Caledonia. 

Florence
 1953 – destroyed hundreds of homes in Florida, no deaths.
 1954 – killed 5 and caused $1.5 million in damage in Mexico.
 1960 – caused slight damage to Florida.
 1963 – did not make landfall 
 1964 – passed west over the Azores while forming, went north, dissipated at sea.
 1965 – stayed at sea and no deaths or damage were reported.
 1969 – powerful tropical storm that affected the state of Baja California.
 1973 – stayed at sea and no deaths or damage were reported.
 1977 – stayed at sea and no deaths or damage were reported.
 1988 – formed in western Gulf of Mexico, passed over New Orleans and Lake Pontchartrain.
 1994 – absorbed by a cold front without threatening land.
 2000 – meandered near Bermuda but caused no damage.
 2006 – struck Bermuda and later Newfoundland.
 2012 – formed near the Cape Verde Islands.
 2018 – peaked as a category 4, killed 57 people and caused extensive damage in both North and South Carolina.

Florita
 2002 – the first of four typhoons to contribute to heavy rainfall and deadly flooding in the Philippines in July 2002.
 2006 – a weak tropical cyclone in July 2006 that caused significant damage to areas of the Philippines, Taiwan, and southeastern China.
 2010 – made landfall on the east coast of Guangdong Province, China, just north of the city of Shantou.
 2014 – a large and powerful tropical cyclone which struck Japan in 2014.
 2018 – a typhoon that worsened the floods in Japan and also caused impacts in South Korea.
 2022 – struck northern Luzon, Philippines.

Flossie
 1950 – a weak tropical storm made landfall near Japan.
 1954 – tracked into open waters
 1956 – a tropical cyclone led to flooding in New Orleans, and broke a drought across the eastern United States the death toll was 15, and total damages reached $24.8 million.
 1958 – affected Japan.
 1961 – a weak tropical storm made landfall Philippines and South China.
 1964 – struck China.
 1966 – stayed at sea.
 1969 – approached Taiwan heavy rains left 75 people dead. 
 1972 – a category 1 typhoon made landfall Philippines and Vietnam a tropical depression as it crossed Vietnam, but it reintensified after entering the Bay of Bengal as Tropical Cyclone 25-72.
 1975 – struck southern China.
 1978 – stayed at sea.
 1983 – did not make landfall.
 1989 – did not make landfall.
 1995 – a tropical cyclone which impacted Mexico and Arizona in August 1995.
 2001 – stayed at sea.
 2007 – a powerful pacific tropical cyclone that brought squally weather and light damage to Hawaii in August 2007.
 2013 – almost made landfall in Hawaii, but moved to the north and weakened.
 2019 – neared Hawaii as a tropical depression.

Floyd
 1981 – caused heavy rainfall on the Leeward Islands, then passed near Bermuda but caused no major damage.
 1987 – crossed over Cuba and impacted the Florida Keys and the Bahamas, but no major damage.
 1993 – made a circuit of the Atlantic before striking Brittany as a strong extratropical storm.
 1999 – deadliest United States hurricane in 27 years, killing 56 in the U.S. and one in the Bahamas, and causing $4.5 billion in damage, at the time the third-costliest storm in U.S. history.
 2006 – a storm that peaked at Category 4 on the Australian intensity scale.

Forrest
 1980 – hit the Philippines.
 1983 – a powerful tropical cyclone on record, with its minimum barometric pressure dropping 100 mbar (3.0 inHg) from September 22 to September 23, in less than a day.
 1986 – stayed at sea.
 1988 – stayed at sea.
 1992 – a powerful tropical cyclone that prompted the evacuation of 600,000 people in Bangladesh in late November 1992.

Fran
 1950 – a late season storm that struck the northern Philippines killing 5 people.
 1955 – did not make landfall.
 1959 – Japan Meteorological Agency analyzed it as a tropical depression, not as a tropical storm.
 1962 – 
 1964 – 
 1967 – 
 1970 – making landfall in China on the 7th.
 1973 (July) – 
 1973 (October) – a long-tracked Category 1 hurricane that caused little damage during its existence in early October 1973.
 1976 – hit southwestern Japan and caused heavy flooding and wind damage.
 1984 – formed close enough to Cape Verde to cause tropical storm-force winds there, but otherwise threatened no land.
 1990 – formed near Cape Verde; it passed between Trinidad and Venezuela, losing strength rapidly and causing no significant damage.
 1992 – a tropical cyclone within four weeks to impact Vanuatu in 1992.
 1996 – made landfall near Cape Fear, North Carolina as a Category 3, killing 26 and causing $3.2 billion in damages.

Francene
 1967 – 
 1971 – stayed over open water and did not affect land.
 1975 –

Frances
 1961 – caused flooding in Puerto Rico, peaked at Category 4 west of Bermuda, subtropical at Nova Scotia.
 1968 – travelled across the central Atlantic Ocean without affecting land.
 1976 – curved over the central Atlantic, affected the Azores as an extratropical storm.
 1980 – travelled up the central Atlantic Ocean without affecting land.
 1986 – briefly drifted over the western Atlantic but never affected land.
 1992 – threatened Bermuda but did not strike the island, then hit Spain as an extratropical storm.
 1998 – a weak storm that caused flooding in East Texas and southern Louisiana.
 2004 – a powerful Category 4 hurricane that struck the Bahamas, and later, as a Category 2 storm, moved extremely slowly over Florida, causing billions in damage.
 2017 –

Francesca
 1966 – 
 1970 – 
 1974 – a category 1 hurricane it neared Baja California by the 17th but turned away before striking.
 2002 – 

Francisco
 2001 – a strong typhoon that never impacted land.
 2007 – a minimal tropical storm that struck southern China.
 2013 – is the 4th super typhoon of the season, which steered well away from Japan.
 2019 — a minimal typhoon that made landfall over Japan and Korea.
 2020 - a minimal tropical storm which affected Madagascar.

Frank
 1980 – 
 1984 – a significant tropical cyclone which formed off the western coast of Australia.
 1986 – 
 1992 –
 1995 – a powerful tropical cyclone brought heavy winds and rains to the Pilbara coast was one of four cyclones to strike in that area.
 1998 – 
 1999 – formed from the remnants of Cyclone Rona off the coast of Queensland and affected New Caledonia.
 2004 (January) – 
 2004 (June) – made landfall as a minimal tropical storm in the Kōchi Prefecture, Japan.
 2004 (August) – 
 2008 – made a direct hit on the Philippines and on China, causing severe damage and resulted in at least 1,371 deaths.
 2010 – a category 1 hurricane that caused minor damage in Mexico in late August 2010.
 2016 – its outer rainbands brought heavy rains to southwestern Mexico.
 2022 – a category 1 hurricane, did not make landfall.

Franklin
 2005 - formed over the Bahamas, then moved erratically in the open ocean, never affecting land directly; twice approached hurricane status.
 2011 - a weak tropical storm that never threatened land.
 2017 - made landfall on the  Yucatán Peninsula as a moderate tropical storm, then made a second landfall in Veracruz, Mexico as a Category 1 hurricane.
 2022 –

Fred
 1980 – Category 4 severe tropical cyclone that stayed out at sea.
 1981 – a category 2 typhoon that struck Hainan Island and Vietnam.
 1994 – a category 4 super typhoon that struck China, resulting on over 1,000 deaths and damages estimated at $874.4 million (1994 USD).
 2009 – Category 3 major hurricane that stayed out at sea.
 2015 – Category 3 major hurricane that remained over the open ocean.
 2021 – made landfall in Hispaniola, degenerated into a tropical wave, then regenerated and made a second landfall in the Florida Panhandle at tropical storm strength. 

Freda
 1952 – a short-lived tropical storm which impacted Kyushu.
 1956 – a typhoon which hit Taiwan and China before affecting Japan and Alaska as a post-tropical system.
 1959 – a strong, late-season typhoon that struck the Philippines, killing 58.
 1962 – a typhoon which formed and remained in the open ocean but later struck the west coast of Canada and the Pacific Northwest coast of the United States as a potent extratropical cyclone, and became known as the Columbus Day Storm of 1962.
 1965 (January) – a tropical cyclone which brought strong winds to Rodrigues and Mauritius.
 1965 (July) – a strong typhoon that made landfall on northern Luzon and on Hainan Island.
 1967 – a late-season typhoon which made landfall in the Philippines and in South Vietnam.
 1971 – a moderate typhoon which hit northern Philippines and southern China.
 1974 – a tropical storm that remained at sea.
 1977 – a strong but short-lived tropical storm which struck Hong Kong.
 1981 (February) – a powerful tropical cyclone which made landfall in New Caledonia.
 1981 (March) – a strong early-season typhoon that remained in the open ocean.
 1984 – a relatively strong tropical storm which struck northern Taiwan and eastern China.
 1985 – a strong tropical cyclone that stayed at sea.
 1987 – a violent typhoon that stayed at sea.
 1997 – an erratic tropical cyclone which eventually affected no land areas.
 2012 – a strong tropical cyclone that affected New Caledonia and the Solomon Islands.

 Freddy
 2009 – A Category 1 tropical cyclone that caused heavy rainfall in Indonesia, two people died due to a landslide caused by the rainfall.
 2023 – a Category 5 tropical cyclone that became the longest-lived tropical cyclone on record after having traversed the entirety of the southern Indian ocean from east to west.

Frederic (1979) – an intense and damaging tropical cyclone that carved a path of destruction from the Lesser Antilles to Quebec, in particular devastating areas of the United States Gulf Coast.

Frieda
 1957 – a minimal hurricane that remained in the open ocean.
 1977 – a weak and short-lived storm that caused moderate rainfall in Belize.

 Fung-wong
 2002 – 
 2008 – a deadly typhoon in the 2008 Pacific typhoon season which made landfall on Taiwan and China.
 2014 – a relatively weak tropical cyclone which affected the northern Philippines, Taiwan and the Eastern China.
 2019 –

Funso (2012) – a powerful tropical cyclone which produced flooding in Mozambique and Malawi in January 2012.

See also

Tropical cyclone
Tropical cyclone naming
European windstorm names
Atlantic hurricane season
List of Pacific hurricane seasons
South Atlantic tropical cyclone

References

General

 
 
 
 
 
 
 
 
 
 
 
 
 
 
 
 
 

 
 
 
 
 

F